Loopy may refer to:

 Casio Loopy, a video game console
 Loopy (film), a 2004 film
 Loopy, a fictional character in the animated TV show KaBlam!
 Loopy de Loop, a cartoon about a character of the same name
 Loopy games, in combinatorial game theory, in which a sequence of moves leads back to the original situation
 Slitherlink or Loopy, a logic puzzle developed by Nikolo
 Loopy a miskolci farkas (Wolf from Miskolc)

See also
 
 Loop (disambiguation)